"Sisters of the Moon" is a song by British-American rock group Fleetwood Mac. It was written and sung by band-member Stevie Nicks and was released in the US as the fourth single from the 1979 album Tusk. It peaked at No. 86 on the Billboard Hot 100. The song was not released in the UK, where "Not That Funny" had been released as a single instead. The 'single version' of "Sisters of the Moon" is included on the compilation The Very Best of Fleetwood Mac and both the 2004 and 2015 remaster of 'Tusk'.

"Sisters of the Moon" emerged from a jam during a session at Village Recorder in Los Angeles. Unlike Nicks' other songs on Tusk, "Sisters of the Moon" was not written with anyone in mind; she found the lyrics nonsensical. When performed live, the song would usually go for over eight minutes in length, most notably the Mirage Tour version in 1982. The song did not appear on any subsequent tour until their 2013 Tour. "Sisters of the Moon" was also played on the North American and European legs of the On with the Show tour, but with an abbreviated guitar solo.

Cash Box said that the song is "mysterious and marvelous" and particularly praised  Lindsey Buckingham's guitar playing, saying that the "notes cry out like a banshee in the night."

Personnel
Mick Fleetwood – drums
John McVie – bass guitar
Christine McVie – keyboards
Lindsey Buckingham – guitars
Stevie Nicks – vocals

Charts

References

Further reading
The Great Rock Discography by Martin C.Strong. Page 378. 

Fleetwood Mac songs
1979 songs
1980 singles
Songs written by Stevie Nicks
Song recordings produced by Ken Caillat
Song recordings produced by Richard Dashut